Kasule is a given name and a surname. It may refer to:

Given name
Kasule Owen (born 1989), Ugandan footballer

Surname
Abubakar Kasule, Ugandan footballer 
Justine Lumumba Kasule, Ugandan educator and politician
Kizito Maria Kasule (born 1967), Ugandan artist and entrepreneur
Noah Babadi Kasule (born 1985), Ugandan footballer
Peninnah Kasule, Ugandan lawyer and corporate executive
Remmy Kasule (born 1949), Ugandan lawyer and judge
Vic Kasule (born 1965), Scottish footballer of Ugandan descent